Elmas Boçe (1852 – 10 October 1925) was an Albanian educator and a signatory of the Albanian Declaration of Independence.

Life 
Born in Gjirokastër in 1852 he studied in Zosimea and later in Istanbul, capital of the Ottoman Empire. A member of the Gjirokastër branch of the League of Prizren, he also funded one of the Albanian-language schools of the city Lirija. In 1911 he took part in the Assembly of Cepo and in 1912 was signatory of the Albanian Declaration of Independence.

He died on October 10, 1925 and rests in the village of Metan in Lushnjë.

References

History of Albanian People. Albanian Academy of Science. 

19th-century Albanian educators
20th-century Albanian educators
1852 births
1925 deaths
Signatories of the Albanian Declaration of Independence
People from Gjirokastër
People from Janina vilayet
Zosimaia School alumni
Albanian educators
All-Albanian Congress delegates